Coronation was a provincial electoral district in Alberta mandated to return a single member to the Legislative Assembly of Alberta from 1913 to 1926 under the First Past the Post voting system and under Single Transferable Vote from 1926 to 1940.

Electoral district history
The Coronation electoral district was created prior to the 1913 Alberta general election from a portion of the Sedgewick electoral district. The Coronation electoral district was re-distributed prior to the 1940 Alberta general election, the area the district covered was merged with Acadia  to form the riding of Acadia-Coronation.

Members of the Legislative Assembly (MLAs)

The first representative for the district, Liberal Frank H. Whiteside was killed in September 1916, no by-election was held to fill the seat.

Election results

1913 general election

1917 general election

1921 general election

1926 general election

1930 general election

1935 general election

See also
List of Alberta provincial electoral districts
Coronation, Alberta, a town in east-central Alberta, Canada, within the County of Paintearth No. 18

References

Further reading

External links
Elections Alberta
The Legislative Assembly of Alberta

Former provincial electoral districts of Alberta